Changzhou (549) is a Type 054A frigate of the People's Liberation Army Navy. She was commissioned on 30 May 2011.

Development and design 

The Type 054A carries HQ-16 medium-range air defence missiles and anti-submarine missiles in a vertical launching system (VLS) system. The HQ-16 has a range of up to 50 km, with superior range and engagement angles to the Type 054's HQ-7. The Type 054A's VLS uses a hot launch method; a shared common exhaust system is sited between the two rows of rectangular launching tubes.

The four AK-630 close-in weapon systems (CIWS) of the Type 054 were replaced with two Type 730 CIWS on the Type 054A. The autonomous Type 730 provides improved reaction time against close-in threats.

Construction and career 
Changzhou was launched on 18 May 2010 at the Hudong-Zhonghua Shipyard in Shanghai. Commissioned on 30 May 2011.

During the 2019 novel coronavirus epidemic, on February 17, 2020, the Liberation Army Daily disclosed that a number of officers and soldiers in the eastern theater of the People's Liberation Army are being quarantined for observation, including Yu Songqiu, captain of Changzhou. According to reports, the theater is adopting measures such as strict management, temperature measurement and disinfection, and returning to the team to isolate, and will adjust the plan to try to ensure that the annual training mission is not affected. The report quoted Yu Songqiu as saying that he himself was under observation in the guest house of a certain detachment, and some officers and soldiers of various units were also under quarantine observation, but the work was smooth and orderly, and the enthusiasm for training and preparation was unabated. In order to return to the team early and complete the isolation as soon as possible, he stopped his vacation and returned to the camp on the fifth day of the Lunar New Year. He is currently using the free time of isolation to study training problems.

Gallery

References 

2010 ships
Ships built in China
Type 054 frigates